The 2022 Qatar motorcycle Grand Prix was the first round of the 2022 Grand Prix motorcycle racing season. It was held at the Losail International Circuit in Lusail on 6 March 2022.

Background

Entries 
In MotoGP and Moto2 classes the riders and teams were the same as the season entry list with no additional stand-in riders for the race. In the premier class five drivers made their debuts in MotoGP: Remy Gardner and  Raúl Fernández, respectively 2021 Moto2 World Champion and runner-up, Fabio di Giannantonio, Marco Bezzecchi and Darryn Binder, who moves from Moto3 to MotoGP as Jack Miller did in 2015. In the intermediate class, the new entries are the 2021 Moto3 World Champion Pedro Acosta, Jeremy Alcoba, Gabriel Rodrigo, Niccolò Antonelli, Filip Salač (from Moto 3), Manuel González, Alessandro Zaccone, Keminth Kubo, Zonta van den Goorbergh and Sean Dylan Kelly.

In Moto3, Taiyo Furusato missed the round after having surgery due to a right ankle injury; he was not replaced. Gerard Riu replaced David Muñoz due to the fact that the latter was under the minimum age. There are eight new entries in the category: Diogo Moreira, Iván Ortolá, Joel Kelso, Daniel Holgado, Matteo Bertelle, Mario Aji, Joshua Whatley and Scott Ogden.

As for the teams, in MotoGP class Aprilia enter the series with their own full factory team effort for the first time since 2004. Gresini Racing, had previously sponsored and supplied bikes with factory support by Aprilia, return as a fully-independent team with their bikes being supplied by Ducati. There are two teams debuting: VR46 Racing Team taking over the grid slots from Esponsorama Racing (who leaves the premier class after 10 seasons) and uses Ducati machinery; RNF MotoGP Racing replaces Sepang Racing Team, which abandoned racing after the decision of main sponsor Petronas to remove support. The team was formed by the management of the Sepang Racing Team and continue to use Yamaha bikes. In Moto2 class, Petronas SRT withdrew from the category, while RW Racing GP return to the series-dominant Kalex chassis, after four seasons operating the factory programme for Japanese chassis builder NTS. In Moto3 class, the vacancy left by Petronas SRT is occupied by the new VisionTrack Racing Team, which uses Honda bikes. Gresini Racing (present since the first year of Moto3) also leaves the light class to focus on MotoGP and Moto2. In its place another Italian team, Team MTA, already present in the Moto3 class as Team Italia from 2014 to 2016, and rides with KTM bikes. Prüstel GP switches from the current KTM motorcycles to CFMoto-rebranded KTM bikes.

Free practice

MotoGP 

In the first session Brad Binder was the fastest, followed by Takaaki Nakagami and Álex Rins. The latter finished in the lead in the second session ahead of Marc Márquez and Joan Mir. In the third session Enea Bastianini set the best time preceded by Pol Espargaró and Francesco Bagnaia. In the combined time classification, reigning world champion Fabio Quartararo does not rank in the top ten and is forced to unpack Q1.

Qualifying

MotoGP

Moto2

Classification

MotoGP

Moto2

 Somkiat Chantra suffered a broken finger in a crash during qualifying and was declared unfit to compete.

Moto3

Championship standings after the race
Below are the standings for the top five riders, constructors, and teams after the round.

MotoGP

Riders' Championship standings

Constructors' Championship standings

Teams' Championship standings

Moto2

Riders' Championship standings

Constructors' Championship standings

Teams' Championship standings

Moto3

Riders' Championship standings

Constructors' Championship standings

Teams' Championship standings

Notes

References

External links

2022 MotoGP race reports
Motorcycle Grand Prix
2022
March 2022 sports events in Qatar